Carlos del Coso (born 24 April 1933) is a Spanish former field hockey player who competed in the 1960 Summer Olympics, in the 1964 Summer Olympics, and in the 1968 Summer Olympics.

References

External links
 

1933 births
Living people
Spanish male field hockey players
Olympic field hockey players of Spain
Field hockey players at the 1960 Summer Olympics
Field hockey players at the 1964 Summer Olympics
Field hockey players at the 1968 Summer Olympics
Olympic bronze medalists for Spain
Olympic medalists in field hockey
Medalists at the 1960 Summer Olympics